Sarun Van (born 5 May 1949) is a Cambodian former backstroke swimmer. He competed in three events at the 1972 Summer Olympics.

References

External links
 

1949 births
Living people
Cambodian male backstroke swimmers
Olympic swimmers of Cambodia
Swimmers at the 1972 Summer Olympics
Place of birth missing (living people)
Southeast Asian Games medalists in swimming
Southeast Asian Games gold medalists for Cambodia
Southeast Asian Games silver medalists for Cambodia
Southeast Asian Games bronze medalists for Cambodia
Competitors at the 1971 Southeast Asian Peninsular Games
Competitors at the 1973 Southeast Asian Peninsular Games